Emeline may refer to:

People
 Emeline Afeaki-Mafile'o, New Zealand activist
 Emeline S. Burlingame (1836–1923), American editor, evangelist and suffragist
 Laura Emeline Eames Chase (1856–1917), American dentist
 Emeline Horton Cleveland (1829–1878), American physician
 Emeline Harriet Howe (1844–1934), American poet
 Emeline Roberts Jones (1836–1916), first woman to practice dentistry in the U.S.
 Emeline Meaker (1838–1883), first woman who was legally executed by Vermont, U.S.
 Emeline Michel, Haitian singer
 Laura Emeline Newell (1854–1916), American songwriter
 Emeline Piggott (1836–1919), Confederate States of America spy from North Carolina, U.S.
 Emeline Hill Richardson (1910-1999), American archaeologist

Places
 Emeline Island, a rocky island on the west side of English Strait

Other uses
 Emeline Fairbanks Memorial Library, in Terre Haute, Indiana, U.S.
 Emeline Patch House, a historic house in Hamilton, Massachusetts, U.S.
 USS Emeline (SP-175), a yacht acquired by the U.S. Navy during World War I
"Emelline", a 2008 song by Charli XCX
 Emmeline, a novel by Charlotte Turner Smith
 Emmeline (given name), a list of people names Emmeline
 Emmeline (Rossner novel), a novel by Judith Rossner
 Emmeline (opera), an opera by Tobias Picker